Breadmakers is a short 2007 documentary film, directed by Yasmin Fedda and produced by Jim Hickey and Robin Mitchell. This is a film about a unique Edinburgh bakery, where a community of workers with learning disabilities make a variety of organic breads for daily delivery to shops and cafes in the city. The Garvald Bakery is part of a centre inspired by the ideas of Rudolf Steiner where the workers realise their potential for self-discovery and creativity in a social environment. Yasmin said that she was surprised about the response that the film received.

Awards
Best Short Scottish Documentary at the 61st Edinburgh International Film Festival (2007)
Best Short Documentary at the Middle East International Film Festival (2008)

Nominations
Best Short Film at BAFTA Scotland (2007)

References

External links 

2007 short documentary films
2007 films
Scottish documentary films
English-language Scottish films
2000s British films
British short documentary films